18-Crown-6 is an organic compound with the formula [C2H4O]6 and the IUPAC name of 1,4,7,10,13,16-hexaoxacyclooctadecane. It is a white, hygroscopic crystalline solid with a low melting point. Like other crown ethers, 18-crown-6 functions as a ligand for some metal cations with a particular affinity for potassium cations (binding constant in methanol: 106 M−1). The point group of 18-crown-6 is S6. The dipole moment of 18-crown-6 varies in different solvent and under different temperature. The synthesis of the crown ethers led to the awarding of the Nobel Prize in Chemistry to Charles J. Pedersen.

Synthesis
This compound is prepared by a modified Williamson ether synthesis in the presence of a templating cation:(CH2OCH2CH2Cl)2  +   (CH2OCH2CH2OH)2  +  2 KOH   →   (CH2CH2O)6  +  2 KCl  +  2 H2O

It can be also prepared by the oligomerization of ethylene oxide.It can be purified by distillation, where its tendency to supercool becomes evident. 18-Crown-6 can also be purified by recrystallisation from hot acetonitrile.  It initially forms an insoluble solvate. Rigorously dry material can be made by dissolving the compound in THF followed by the addition of NaK to give [K(18-crown-6)]Na, an alkalide salt.  

Crystallographic analysis reveals a relatively flat molecule but one where the oxygen centres are not oriented in the idealized 6-fold symmetric geometry usually shown.  The molecule undergoes significant conformational change upon complexation.

Reactions

18-Crown-6 has a high affinity for the hydronium ion H3O+, as it can fit inside the crown ether.  Thus, reaction of 18-crown-6 with strong acids gives the cation [H3O.18-crown-6]+. For example, interaction of 18-crown-6 with HCl gas in toluene with a little moisture gives an ionic liquid layer with the composition , from which the solid [H3O.18-crown-6]+[HCl2]- can be isolated on standing.  Reaction of the ionic liquid layer with two molar equivalents of water gives the crystalline product (H5O2)[H3O.18-crown-6]Cl2.

Applications

18-Crown-6 binds to a variety of small cations, using all six oxygens as donor atoms. Crown ethers can be used in the laboratory as phase transfer catalysts. Salts which are normally insoluble in organic solvents are made soluble by crown ether. For example, potassium permanganate dissolves in benzene in the presence of 18-crown-6, giving the so-called "purple benzene", which can be used to oxidize diverse organic compounds.

Various substitution reactions are also accelerated in the presence of 18-crown-6, which suppresses ion-pairing. The anions thereby become naked nucleophiles. For example, using 18-crown-6, potassium acetate is a more powerful nucleophile in organic solvents:

[K(18-crown-6)+]OAc−  +  C6H5CH2Cl    →    C6H5CH2OAc  +  [K(18-crown-6)+]Cl−

The first electride salt to be examined with X-ray crystallography, [Cs(18-crown-6)2]+·e−, was synthesized in 1983. This highly air- and moisture-sensitive solid has a sandwich molecular structure, where the electron is trapped within nearly spherical lattice cavities. However, the shortest electron-electron distance is too long (8.68 Å) to make this material a conductor of electricity.

References

External links
 Sigma Aldrich chemical profile

Crown ethers
Macrocycles